Ethnikos means National in Greek and may refer to the following:

In football,
Ethnikos Achna FC, a football team from Achna, Cyprus
Ethnikos Assia, a lower-league football team from Assia, Cyprus
Ethnikos Asteras, a football team from Athens, Greece
Ethnikos Filippiada F.C., a football team from Filippiada, Greece
Ethnikos Katerini, a lower-league football team from Katerini, Greece
Ethnikos Patron, a lower-league football team from Patras, Greece
Ethnikos Piraeus, a football team from Piraeus, Greece